A football is a ball inflated with air that is used to play one of the various sports known as football. In these games, with some exceptions, goals or points are scored only when the ball enters one of two designated goal-scoring areas; football games involve the two teams each trying to move the ball in opposite directions along the field of play.

The first balls were made of natural materials, such as an inflated pig bladder, later put inside a leather cover, which has given rise to the American slang-term "pigskin". Modern balls are designed by teams of engineers to exacting specifications, with rubber or plastic bladders, and often with plastic covers. Various leagues and games use different balls, though they all have one of the following basic shapes:
 a sphere: used in association football and Gaelic football
 a prolate spheroid (elongated sphere)
 either with rounded ends: used in the rugby codes and Australian football
 or with more pointed ends: used in American football
The precise shape and construction of footballs is typically specified as part of the rules and regulations.

The oldest football still in existence, which is thought to have been made circa 1550, was discovered in the roof of Stirling Castle, Scotland, in 1981. The ball is made of leather (possibly from a deer) and a pig's bladder.

Association football

The weight specified for a ball is the dry weight, as older balls often became significantly heavier in the course of a match played in wet weather. There are a number of different types of football balls depending on the match and turf including: training footballs, match footballs, professional match footballs, beach footballs, street footballs, indoor footballs, turf balls, futsal footballs and mini/skills footballs.

Most modern Association footballs are stitched from 32 panels of waterproofed leather or plastic: 12 regular pentagons and 20 regular hexagons. The 32-panel configuration is the spherical polyhedron corresponding to the truncated icosahedron; it is spherical because the faces bulge from the pressure of the air inside. The first 32-panel ball was marketed by Select in the 1950s in Denmark. This configuration became common throughout Continental Europe in the 1960s, and was publicised worldwide by the Adidas Telstar, the official ball of the 1970 World Cup. This design in often referenced when describing the truncated icosahedron Archimedean solid, carbon buckyballs, or the root structure of geodesic domes.

Gridiron football

In the United States and Canada, the term football usually refers to a ball made of cow hide leather, which is required in professional and collegiate football. Footballs used in recreation and in organized youth leagues may be made of rubber or plastic materials (the high school football rulebooks still allow the inexpensive all-rubber footballs, though they are less common than leather). Since 1941, Horween Leather Company has been the exclusive supplier of leather for National Football League footballs. The arrangement was established by Arnold Horween, who had played and coached in the NFL. Horween Leather Company also supplies leather to Spalding, supplier of balls to the Arena Football League.

Leather panels are typically tanned to a natural brown color, which is usually required in professional leagues and collegiate play. At least one manufacturer uses leather that has been tanned to provide a "tacky" grip in dry or wet conditions. Historically, white footballs have been used in games played at night so that the ball can be seen more easily however, improved artificial lighting conditions have made this no longer necessary. At most levels of play (but not, notably, the NFL), white stripes are painted on each end of the ball, halfway around the circumference, to improve nighttime visibility and also to differentiate the college football from the pro football. However, the NFL once explored the usage of white-striped footballs – in Super Bowl VIII.

In the CFL the stripes traverse the entire circumference of the ball. The UFL used a ball with lime-green stripes. The XFL of 2001 used a novel color pattern, a black ball with red curved lines in lieu of stripes, for its footballs; this design was redone in a tan and navy color scheme for the Arena Football League in 2003. A ball with red, white and blue panels was introduced in the American Indoor Football League in 2005 and used by its successors, as well as the Ultimate Indoor Football League of the early 2010s and the Can-Am Indoor Football League during its lone season in 2017. The XFL of 2020 uses standard brown but with X markings on each point instead of stripes.

Footballs used in gridiron-style games have prominent points on both ends. The shape is generally credited to official Hugh "Shorty" Ray, who introduced the new ball in 1934 as a way to make the forward pass more effective.

Australian rules football

The football used in Australian football is similar to a rugby ball but generally slightly smaller and more rounded at the ends, but more elongated in overall appearance, being longer by comparison with its width than a rugby ball. In the AFL, the balls are red for day matches and yellow for night matches.

The first games of Australian football were played with a round ball, because balls of that shape were more readily available. In 1860, Australian football pioneer Tom Wills argued that the oval rugby ball travelled further in the air and made for a more exciting game. It became customary in Australian football by the 1870s.

The Australian football ball was invented by T. W. Sherrin in 1880, after he was given a misshapen rugby ball to fix. Sherrin designed the ball with indented rather than pointy ends to give the ball a better bounce.

Australian football ball brands include Burley, Ross Faulkner, and Sherrin (the brand used by the Australian Football League).

Gaelic football

It may be kicked or hand passed. A hand pass is not a punch but rather a strike of the ball with the side of the closed fist, using the knuckle of the thumb.

Rugby football

Until 1870, rugby was played with a near spherical ball with an inner-tube made of a pig's bladder. In 1870 Richard Lindon and Bernardo Solano started making balls for Rugby school out of hand stitched, four-panel, leather casings and pigs' bladders. The rugby ball's distinctive shape is supposedly due to the pig's bladder, although early balls were more plum-shape than oval. The balls varied in size in the beginning depending upon how large the pig's bladder was. Because of the pliability of rubber the shape gradually changed from a sphere to an egg. In 1892 the RFU endorsed ovalness as the compulsory shape. The gradual flattening of the ball continued over the years.
The introduction of synthetic footballs over the traditional leather balls, in both rugby codes, was originally governed by weather conditions. If the playing surface was wet, the synthetic ball was used, because it wouldn't absorb water and become heavy. Eventually, the leather balls were phased out completely.

Rugby league

Rugby league is played with a prolate spheroid shaped football which is inflated with air. A referee will stop play immediately if the ball does not meet the requirements of size and shape. Traditionally made of brown leather, modern footballs are synthetic and manufactured in a variety of colours and patterns. Senior competitions should use light-coloured balls to allow spectators to see the ball more easily. Smaller-sized balls are used for junior versions of the game, such as "Mini" and "Mod". Rugby league footballs are slightly more pointed than rugby union footballs and larger than American footballs.

The Australasian National Rugby League and Super League use balls made by Steeden. Steeden is also sometimes used in Australia as a noun to describe the ball itself.

Rugby union

The ball used in rugby union, usually referred to as a rugby ball, is a prolate spheroid essentially elliptical in profile. Traditionally made of brown leather, modern footballs are manufactured in a variety of colours and patterns.

In 1980, leather-encased balls, which were prone to water-logging, were replaced with balls encased in synthetic waterproof materials. The Gilbert Synergie was the match ball of the 2007 Rugby World Cup.

See also
 List of inflatable manufactured goods

Bibliography
 Angela Royston, 2005. How Is a Soccer Ball Made? Heinemann. .

Footnotes

External links

 Official FIFA Football BALL Website
 Ki-o-Rahi history and rules
 Paper model truncated icosahedron (association football ball)
 Popular Mechanics article on American football manufacturing process

Association football equipment
Rugby league equipment
Rugby union equipment
Association football terminology
Ball
Balls
Inflatable manufactured goods